James Denny may refer to:
James William Denny (1838–1923), U.S. Representative from Maryland
James Denny (diver) (born 1993), British diver
James Denny (conductor) (1908–1978), conductor, music scholar and academic